Sigmund Eisner (February 14, 1859 – January 5, 1925) was a prominent manufacturer and president of the Sigmund Eisner Company based in Red Bank, New Jersey. At one time (1922), this company was the exclusive manufacturer of uniforms for the Boy Scouts of America and the largest manufacturer of uniforms in the United States. He is also known as the great-grandfather of Michael Eisner, who was CEO of The Walt Disney Company from 1984 to 2005.

Early life
Sigmund Eisner was born in Bohemia to a Jewish family and educated in public schools there. At the age of 21 he came to the United States and founded the Sigmund Eisner Company.

Sigmund Eisner Company 
The Sigmund Eisner Company started with only a few garments, but specialized in uniforms. With a central factory in Red Bank, New Jersey, branches were established in nearby towns Long Branch, South Amboy, and Freehold. As of 1922, the company had 2,000 employees, but during World War I the company’s roles swelled to 5,000 as the company handled contracts for the United States government as well as several foreign governments.

Eisner’s family was also involved in the company.  As of 1922, Eisner’s sons H. Raymond and A. Victor were first and second vice-presidents, respectively.

Red Bank
Sigmund Eisner (and his family) took great interest in civic and social affairs. Sigmund was governor of the Monmouth Memorial Hospital and the State Home for Boys at Jamesburg, New Jersey. He was vice-president of the Red Cross of Monmouth County and water commissioner of Red Bank. Eisner was a member of the American Jewish Committee, the Jewish Welfare Board of America, and the Zionist Committee of America. His personal interests led him to membership in the Free and Accepted Masons, Ancient Order Nobles of the Mystic Shrine; the Benevolent and Protective Order of Elks; and the Monmouth County Boat Club.

Family
Sigmund married Bertha Weis and they had four sons: H. Raymond, J. Lester, Monroe, and A. Victor.

H. Raymond, the eldest son, was born in Red Bank and attended the public schools. He graduated in the 1906 class of the Phillips Exeter Academy. Following his graduation he studied at Harvard University and graduated in 1909. Before becoming a vice-president at his father’s company, he attended the Philadelphia Textile School for a one-year course. H. Raymond married Elsie Solomon in Rochester, New York on February 12, 1911.

J. Lester, the second son, was also born in Red Bank, New Jersey. He also took his preparatory course at Exeter and graduated Harvard University in 1911.  J. Lester married Marguerite Davidson on January 13, 1913. Disney CEO Michael Eisner is one of their grandchildren.

Monroe Eisner, the third son, was also born in Red Bank, entered Phillips Exeter Academy (graduated 1910) and was awarded a Bachelor of Arts degree from Harvard in 1914. Thereafter, he attended the Harvard Graduate School of Business Administration and graduated in 1915. During his studies he also was active with the Everett Mills in Everett Massachusetts where he studied fabrics. In 1916 he returned to Red Bank to work at the family factory. Monroe married (in New York City) Winone Jackson on September 11, 1916.

The youngest son, A. Victor (born December 11, 1894) studied at Washington and Jefferson College at Washington, Pennsylvania. At the conclusion of his studies, be entered the family business as second vice-president. A. Victor married Helene Monsky in September 1918.

References

History of Monmouth County, New Jersey 1664–1920, Volume II, Lewis Historical Publishing Company, 1922, pgs. 99–101.
Scannell's New Jersey’s First Citizens: 1917–1918, Vol. I, Paterson, NJ, pgs. 157–158.

1859 births
1925 deaths
People from Red Bank, New Jersey
American people of Austrian-Jewish descent
Austrian Jews
Austro-Hungarian emigrants to the United States
Austro-Hungarian Jews
People from Horažďovice